Henry Farrell is an Irish-born political scientist at Johns Hopkins University.  He previously taught at the University of Toronto and earned his PhD from Georgetown University.  His research interests include, trust and co-operation; E-commerce; the European Union; and institutional theory.

Career 
Farrell is a member of the Crooked Timber group blog. In this connection, he has been quoted extensively in mass media, including the Christian Science Monitor, San Francisco Chronicle, Washington Times and the National Journal on topics including Italian involvement in the Yellowcake forgery scandal and his work with Daniel Drezner on the political impact of blogging. He has written articles on blogging for Foreign Policy and The Chronicle of Higher Education He has written for the Washington Post blog, Monkey Cage.

Farrell has organized several on-line seminars on recently published books, including Freakonomics by Steven Levitt and Stephen J. Dubner and Iron Council by China Miéville. He is also frequently on BloggingHeads.tv in discussions with other media personalities.

Books
  The Political Economy of Trust: Institutions, Interests and Inter-Firm Cooperation in Italy and Germany (2009) Cambridge University Press.
Privacy and Power: The Transatlantic Struggle Over Freedom and Security (with Abraham L. Newman) (2019) Princeton University Press.

References 
  Berlusconi: 'I tried to get Bush to not invade Iraq', Christian Science Monitor
  Seeds of leak scandal sown in Italian intelligence agency, San Francisco Chronicle
  Merlot Democrats, Google Republicans, Washington Times
  The Rise of Blogs, National Journal, January 2006
  Web of Influence, Foreign Policy, November 2004
  The Blogosphere as a Carnival of Ideas Chronicle of Higher Education, November 2005 (reprinted in The Australian, December 2005)

Works by Farrell

External links 
 Henry Farrell's website
 When Web Rumors Run Amok, NPR
 Regarding Henry, National Journal Blogometer, January 2006
 Video interviews/conversations with Farrell on Bloggingheads.tv

George Washington University faculty
Living people
Elliott School of International Affairs faculty
1970 births
Georgetown University alumni